Eudema is a genus of flowering plant in the family Brassicaceae from South America. It contains six species, including Eudema nubigena.

References

 
Brassicaceae genera
Taxa named by Aimé Bonpland
Taxa named by Alexander von Humboldt
Taxonomy articles created by Polbot